Lee Hardy (born 26 November 1981) is an English former professional footballer who played as a midfielder in the Football League for Oldham Athletic and Macclesfield Town and in the Scottish League for Ayr United, St Johnstone and Hamilton Academical. He began his football career as a trainee with Blackburn Rovers, without playing for the first team, and also played non-league football for Hucknall Town and Leigh RMI. He retired from football on medical advice in January 2006, aged 24, after suffering an ankle injury.

References

External links
 

1981 births
Living people
Sportspeople from Blackpool
English footballers
Association football midfielders
Blackburn Rovers F.C. players
Oldham Athletic A.F.C. players
Macclesfield Town F.C. players
Hucknall Town F.C. players
Leigh Genesis F.C. players
Ayr United F.C. players
St Johnstone F.C. players
Hamilton Academical F.C. players
English Football League players
Scottish Football League players